Chillerton is a village between Newport and Chale in the Isle of Wight in southern England. Chillerton is in the middle of a farming community. It is in the civil parish of Chillerton and Gatcombe, along with nearby Gatcombe; the parish had a total population of 422 at the 2011 census. 

The nearby Chillerton Down is the site of an unfinished Iron Age promontory fort and a  antenna for the Isle of Wight radio station broadcasting on 107.00 MHz, as well as several other stations. It is the village's most prominent feature and can be seen from most parts of the island. It is known as the Chillerton Down transmitting station. Chillerton Down is flown by Paragliders in a E to SE wind and on days with good thermals the top of the mast can be reached.

In 1907, a contract was signed that ensured that properties older than 1907 in Chillerton and nearby Gatcombe would receive free water, while newer homes receive it at a reduced rate. In 2009 Southern Water proposed that everyone to pay the same rate, claiming that the reasoning behind the initial pact is now invalid, as the costs for the original project have since been paid off.

Originally, the main school was Chillerton and Rookley Primary School, located on the Main Road in Chillerton. It was a small village school with a total of 43 students on roll from local areas as of 2008. However, in 2010 it was announced that the school would be combining with primary schools in Godshill and Wroxall. The new school would have two campuses, in Godshill and Wroxall.

Public transport is provided by Southern Vectis bus route 6, which runs between Newport and Ventnor and Wightbus route 36, running between Newport and Moortown.

References 

Villages on the Isle of Wight